In Hawaiian, ka ‘ena means "the heat."

Hawaiian place names
 Ka‘ena Point is the westernmost point of the Hawaiian Island of O‘ahu. There is  a state park at Ka‘ena Point. There is a USAF Satellite Tracking Station above Ka‘ena Point.
 Kaʻena Ridge is a submerged shield volcano northeast of the island of Oʻahu.
 Ka‘ena is a point and land section on Hawai‘i Island,
 Ka‘ena is the name of the northwestern tip of the Island of Lāna‘i.

Other uses
 Kaena is the name of the main character in the movie Kaena: The Prophecy distributed by Sony Pictures